The Piper PA-23, named Apache and later Aztec, is an American four- to six-seat twin-engined light aircraft aimed at the general-aviation market. The United States Navy and military forces in other countries also used it in small numbers. Originally designed in the 1950s by the Stinson Aircraft Company, Piper Aircraft manufactured the Apache and a more powerful version, the Aztec, in the United States from the 1950s to the 1980s.

Design and development
The PA-23 was the first twin-engined Piper aircraft, and was developed from a proposed "Twin Stinson" design, inherited when Piper bought the Stinson Division of the Consolidated Vultee Aircraft Corporation. The prototype PA-23 was a four-seat, low-wing, all-metal monoplane with a twin tail, powered by two 125 hp Lycoming O-290-D piston engines; it first flew on March 2, 1952. The aircraft performed badly, so it was redesigned with a single vertical stabilizer and an all-metal rear fuselage and more powerful 150 hp Lycoming O-320-A engines.

Apache
(ICAO code: PA23)

Two new prototypes of the redesigned aircraft, now named Apache, were built in 1953 and entered production in 1954; 1,231 were built. In 1958, the Apache 160 was produced by upgrading the engines to 160 hp (119 kW); 816 were built.
The Apache 160 was  superseded in 1962 by the Aztec-derived Apache 235. With a 1962 price of $45,000, the Apache 235 featured  the Aztec's 235 hp (175 kW) engines and swept tail surfaces (119 built).

Aztec
(ICAO code: PA27)

In 1959, Piper produced an upgraded version with 250 hp (186 kW) Lycoming O-540 engines and a swept vertical tail as the PA-23-250, and named it Aztec. The first models came in a five-seat configuration. In 1961, a longer-nosed variant, the Aztec B, entered production. Later Aztecs were equipped with Lycoming IO-540 fuel-injected engines and six-seat capacity, and remained in production until 1982. Turbocharged versions of the later models could fly at higher altitudes.

The United States Navy acquired 20 Aztecs, designating them UO-1, which changed to U-11A when unified designations were adopted in 1962.

In 1974, Piper produced a single experimental PA-41P Pressurized Aztec concept. This concept was short-lived, however, as the aspects of the Aztec that made it so popular for its spacious interior and ability to haul large loads did not lend themselves well to supporting the sealed pressure vessel required for a pressurized aircraft. The project was scrapped, and the one pressurized Aztec produced, N9941P, was donated to Mississippi State University, where it was used for testing purposes. In 2000, N9941P was donated to the Piper Aviation Museum in Lock Haven, Pennsylvania, on the condition that it never be flown again. It is now there on display.

Variants

Apache

PA-23 Twin-Stinson
Original designation of the Piper PA-23 Apache
PA-23 Apache
Initial production version, 2047 built (including the Apache E, G and H)
PA-23-150 Apache B
1955 variant with minor changes
PA-23-150 Apache C
1956 variant with minor changes
PA-23-150 Apache D
1957 variant with minor changes
PA-23-160 Apache E
PA-23 powered by two 160 hp O-320-B engines
PA-23-160 Apache G
PA-23 with longer internal cabin and extra window
PA-23-160 Apache H
Apache G with O-320-B2B engines and minor changes
PA-23-235 Apache 235
Apache with five seats and 235 hp O-540 engines, 118 built

Apache G with modified rear fuselage, new fin and rudder and 250hp Lycoming O-540-A1D engines, 4811 built (including subvariants)
Seguin Geronimo
Apache with a series of modifications to the engines, nose, and tail

Aztec

PA-23-250 Aztec B
1962-1964. Aztec with longer nose for a baggage compartment; six seats, new instrument panel and changes to systems.
PA-23-250 Aztec C and Aztec C Turbo
1964-1968. Aztec B with either IO-540-C4B5 engines or turbocharged TIO-540-C1A as an option, also modified engine nacelles and modified landing gear.
PA-23-250 Aztec D and Aztec D Turbo
1969-1970. Aztec C with revised instrument panel and controls.
PA-23-250 Aztec E and Aztec E Turbo
1971-1975. Aztec D with longer pointed nose and a single-piece windshield.
PA-23-250 Aztec F and Aztec F Turbo
1976-1981. Aztec E with improved systems and cambered wingtips and tailplane tip extensions.
U-11A
United States Navy designation formerly UO-1.
UO-1
United States Navy designation for PA-23-250 Aztec with additional equipment; 20 delivered, later re-designated U-11A.
PA-41P Pressurized Aztec
Pressurized Aztec concept, one built.

Operators

Military operators
 
 
 
 
 
 
 
 Public Force of Costa Rica
 
 Fuezas Aéreas Ejército de Cuba
 

Guatemalan Air Force
 
 Honduran Air Force
 
 Haitian Air Force
 
 

 Nicaraguan Air Force
 
 Spanish Air Force
 Escuadrón 912
 Escuadrilla de Enlace 905
 
 Paraguayan Air Force
 Grupo Aéreo de Transporte Especial/GATE
 
 Air Operations Element, Papua New Guinea Defence Force - former operator
 
 
 United States Navy
 
 Uruguay
Uruguayan Air Force

Specifications (PA-23-250F, normally aspirated)

Accidents and incidents

On 21 March 1964, a Piper PA-23-160 Apache (G-ASHC) crashed on its approach to the Aintree racecourse, near Liverpool, killing all 5 on board. The flight had taken off from Luton Airport and included broadcaster Nancy Spain, who was covering the Grand National, and her friend Joan Werner Laurie, who was learning to fly. The CAA accident report stated that passenger interference could not be ruled out as a cause of the accident.
On 18 July 1967 Aztec C PP-ETT was hit by a Lockheed T-33 of the Brazilian Air Force near Mondubim, Brazil, killing the former President of Brazil Humberto de Alencar Castelo Branco. 
On 18 April 1974, Aztec G-AYDE collided with Court Line Flight 95, a BAC One-Eleven, at London Luton Airport after the pilot of the Aztec entered the active runway without clearance. He was killed and his passenger was injured. All 91 people on board the One-Eleven successfully evacuated after the takeoff was aborted.
On 29 November 1975, retired Formula One racing driver and Embassy Hill team owner Graham Hill was piloting a Piper PA-23-250 Turbo Aztec D, marked as N6645Y, from Circuit Paul Ricard, France, to London, United Kingdom. His passengers were Embassy Hill race driver Tony Brise, team manager Ray Brimble, designer Andy Smallman and mechanics Terry Richards and Tony Alcock. While on approach to land at Elstree Airfield, Hertfordshire, shortly before 10 pm, in thick fog the aircraft hit trees on a golf course at Arkley, Hertfordshire. The ensuing crash and explosion killed everyone on board.
On 15 April 1978, Hollywood stunt flyer Frank Tallman was ferrying a Piper Aztec from Santa Monica Airport, California, to Phoenix, Arizona under visual flight rules when he continued the flight into deteriorating weather, a lowering ceiling and rain. He struck the side of Santiago Peak in the Santa Ana Mountains near Trabuco Canyon at cruise altitude, dying in the ensuing crash.

See also

References

Notes

Bibliography

External links

Used Aircraft Guide: Piper Apache-Aztec by AVweb

1950s United States civil utility aircraft
PA-23
Low-wing aircraft
Aircraft first flown in 1952
Twin piston-engined tractor aircraft